Renee Griffin (born May 30, 1968) is an American actress.

Early life and education 
She was born in Long Beach, California and attended John F. Kennedy High School in La Palma, California. She studied drama at Fullerton College, where she appeared on stage in productions of Crimes of the Heart, The Philadelphia Story, and The Star-Spangled Girl.

Career 
Griffin was a regular cast member on the ABC soap Port Charles, playing the part of Danielle Ashley from 1997-1998. In 2001, she appeared on the TV series Black Scorpion as the villain Aerobicide.

Griffin is best known for her role as Lanie in the cult favorite stoner film, The Stoned Age (1994), and as Angel who was decapitated in the 1991 action movie Showdown in Little Tokyo.

Renee has guest-starred on High Tide, Dangerous Women, Eye on L.A., and on CSI: Crime Scene Investigation.

Personal life 
Griffin is married to actor James Marshall.

Filmography

Film

Television

External links

1968 births
20th-century American actresses
Actresses from Long Beach, California
American soap opera actresses
American television actresses
Fullerton College alumni
Living people
21st-century American women